Lyndhurst Secondary College is a co-educational secondary school, located in Cranbourne North, Victoria, Australia, which is approximately 40 km south east of Melbourne.

History 
Founded in 1981 as Cranbourne Meadows Technical School, the curriculum consisted mainly of technical classes such as Automotive, Textiles, Wood & Metal Work, Ceramics, Home Economics, and more.  For the first term due to school still being built students were sent to Doveton High and Doveton Technical schools for classes. When technical schools began to fall out of use, the school changed its name to Lyndhurst Secondary College.

School profile 
Lyndhurst's student body consists of around 750 students from Year 7 to Year 12.

The School Colors are based on uniform colors, blue and white. For sporting activities, students are divided into houses. These houses and their colors are: Red – Hale, white – Sayers, green – Kettner, yellow – Flintoff. The school offers both VCE and VCAL pathways in the senior years.

References 

 

Secondary schools in Melbourne
Educational institutions established in 1988
1988 establishments in Australia
Buildings and structures in the City of Casey